The 1947 Pittsburgh Steelers season was the franchise's 15th season in the National Football League (NFL). The team improved on its 1946 record by winning eight games and losing four. This record tied for the lead in the Eastern Division and qualified the Steelers for the franchise's first  It was the Steelers' only postseason appearance before 1972.

It was Jock Sutherland's second and final year as head coach; he died the following April after being found wandering around in a field in Kentucky. Once flown back to Pittsburgh, he was diagnosed as having two brain tumors. He only lived a few more days.

Pre-Season Changes
In 1946, the Steeler offense and defense featured the NFL MVP in the person of Bill Dudley. The Virginia grad and Army veteran led the NFL in rushing, interceptions, punt returns and all-purpose yards. Despite being wildly popular with fans and fellow players, Dudley and Coach Sutherland could not get along. Ultimately, Dudley asked Art Rooney, Sr. to trade him and the owner reluctantly agreed. 

Dudley was traded to the Detroit Lions for Bob Cifers and Paul White.  Additionally, the Steelers received the Lions' 1948 first round draft pick. Both White and Cifers had a demonstrable positive effect on the team. Cifers played brilliantly and was one of the top punters in the NFL that year.

Draft

Regular season

Schedule
{| class="wikitable" style="text-align:center"
|-
!style=""| Week
!style=""| Date
!style=""| Opponent
!style=""| Result
!style=""| Record
!style=""| Venue
!style=""| Gamerecap
|-style="background:#cfc"
! 1
| September 21 
| Detroit Lions
| W 17–10
| 1–0
| Forbes Field
| Recap
|-style="background: #fcc;"
! 2
| September 29
| Los Angeles Rams
| L 7–48
| 1–1
| Forbes Field
| Recap
|-style="background: #fcc;"
! 3
| October 5
| at Washington Redskins
| L 26–27
| 1–2
| Griffith Stadium
| Recap
|-style="background: #cfc;"
! 4
| October 12
| at Boston Yanks
| W 30–14
| 2–2
| Fenway Park
| Recap
|-style="background: #cfc;"
! 5
| October 19
| Philadelphia Eagles
| W 35–24
| 3–2
| Forbes Field
| Recap
|-style="background: #cfc;"
! 6
| October 26
| at New York Giants
| W 38–21
| 4–2
| Polo Grounds
| Recap
|-style="background: #cfc;"
! 7
| November 2
| at Green Bay Packers
| W 18–17
| 5–2
| Wisconsin State Fair Park
| Recap
|-style="background: #cfc;"
! 8
| November 9
| Washington Redskins
| W 21–14
| 6–2
| Forbes Field
| Recap
|-style="background: #cfc;"
! 9
| November 16
| New York Giants
| W 24–7
| 7–2
| Forbes Field
| Recap
|-style="background: #fcc;"
! 10
| November 23
| at Chicago Bears
| L 7–49
| 7–3
| Wrigley Field
| Recap
|-style="background: #fcc;"
! 11
| November 30
| at Philadelphia Eagles
| L 0–21
| 7–4
| Shibe Park
| Recap
|-style="background: #cfc;"
! 12
| December 7
| Boston Yanks| W 17–7
| 8–4
| Forbes Field
| Recap
|-
! 13
| colspan="6" | Bye
|-style=""
|colspan="8"| Note: Intra-division opponents are in bold text.
|}

Playoffs

The 1947 team was the most successful team in club history to date. It was the Steelers' first playoff appearance, the first time winning more than four games consecutively, and the club posted a franchise-best  record. Though the Steelers lost the playoff, fans and players were excited for their future.

However, fate would interrupt again when head coach Jock Sutherland took a trip to visit family in Kentucky. He ran off the road and was found wondering in a muddy field. Flown back to Pittsburgh, Sutherland died four days later on April 11, 1948, due to complications from a brain tumor. It was a sudden and disheartening end to a successful period in team history. The Steelers did not  play in the postseason again until 1972.

Game summaries
 Week 1 
Sunday, September 21: Detroit Lions

at Forbes Field, Pittsburgh, Pennsylvania

 Game time: 
 Game weather: 
 Game attendance: 34,691
 Referee:Scoring Drives: Detroit – Dudley 30 pass from Zimmerman (Zimmerman kick)
 Pittsburgh – Jansante 15 pass from Slater (Glamp kick)
 Detroit – FG Zimmerman 18
 Pittsburgh – Repko 48 fumble run (Glamp kick)
 Pittsburgh – FG Glamp 35

 Week 2 
Monday, September 29: Los Angeles Rams

at Forbes Field, Pittsburgh, Pennsylvania

 Game time: 
 Game weather: 
 Game attendance: 35,658
 Referee:Scoring Drives: Los Angeles – FG Waterfield 30
 Los Angeles – FG Waterfield 45
 Los Angeles – Hoerner 4 run (Waterfield kick)
 Pittsburgh – Lach 4 run (Glamp kick)
 Los Angeles – Benton 11 pass from Waterfield (Waterfield kick)
 Los Angeles – Washington 9 lateral from Waterfield (Waterfield kick)
 Los Angeles – Hubbell 45 pass from Waterfield (Waterfield kick)
 Los Angeles – Hubbell 15 pass from Hardy (Waterfield kick)
 Los Angeles – Washington 6 run

 Week 3 
Sunday, October 5): Washington Redskins

at Griffith Stadium, Washington, DC

 Game time: 
 Game weather: 
 Game attendance: 36,565
 Referee:Scoring Drives: Pittsburgh – FG Glamp 15
 Washington – Nussbaumer 55 pass from Baugh (Poillon kick)
 Pittsburgh – Lach 15 pass from Clement (Glamp kick)
 Washington – Poillon 3 pass from Baugh (kick failed)
 Pittsburgh – Compagno 64 int (Glamp kick)
 Washington – Taylor 35 pass from Baugh (Poillon kick)
 Pittsburgh – Sullivan 50 pass from Clement (Glamp kick)
 Pittsburgh – Safety, Baugh stepped out of end zone
 Washington – Farmer 1 run (Poillon kick)

 Week 4 
Sunday, October 12: Boston Yanks

at Fenway Park, Boston, Massachusetts

 Game time: 
 Game weather: 
 Game attendance: 18,894
 Referee:Scoring Drives: Pittsburgh – Lach 1 run (Glamp kick)
 Pittsburgh – White 52 run (Glamp kick)
 Pittsburgh – Lach 1 run (Glamp kick)
 Pittsburgh – Safety, Dancewicz tackled in end zone by Bova
 Pittsburgh – Clement 1 run (Glamp kick)
 Boston – Currivan 33 pass from Dancewicz (Scollard kick)
 Boston – Currivan 20 pass from Dancewicz (Maznicki kick)

 Week 5 
Sunday, October 19: Philadelphia Eagles

at Forbes Field, Pittsburgh, Pennsylvania

 Game time: 
 Game weather: 
 Game attendance: 33,538
 Referee:Scoring Drives: Pittsburgh – Compagno 39 pass from Clement (Glamp kick)
 Philadelphia – Pihos 43 pass from Thompson (Patton kick)
 Philadelphia – FG Patton 14
 Philadelphia – Pritchard 69 pass from Thompson (Patton kick)
 Pittsburgh – Clement 5 run (Glamp kick)
 Philadelphia – Pihos 17 pass from Thompson (Patton kick)
 Pittsburgh – Garnaas 19 pass from Clement (Glamp kick)
 Pittsburgh – Clement 23 run (Glamp kick)
 Pittsburgh – Lach 1 run (Glamp kick)

 Week 6 
Sunday, October 26: New York Giants

at Polo Grounds, New York, New York

 Game time: 
 Game weather: 
 Game attendance: 41,736
 Referee:Scoring Drives: Pittsburgh – Jansante 7 pass from Lach (Glamp kick)
 New York – Carroll 18 pass from Governali (Strong kick)
 Pittsburgh – Lach 1 run (Glamp kick)
 Pittsburgh – Lach 1 run (Glamp kick)
 Pittsburgh – FG Glamp 37
 Pittsburgh – Garnaas 68 pass from Clement (Glamp kick)
 New York – Blumenstock 1 run (Strong kick)
 Pittsburgh – Sinkovitz 47 int (Glamp kick)
 New York – Livingston 65 pass from Governali (Strong kick)

 Week 7 
Sunday, November 2: Green Bay Packers

at Wisconsin State Fair Park, Milwaukee, Wisconsin

 Game time: 
 Game weather: 
 Game attendance: 30,073
 Referee:Scoring Drives: Green Bay – Goodnight 69 pass from Jacobs (Cuff kick)
 Green Bay – FG Cuff 16
 Pittsburgh – FG Glamp 23
 Pittsburgh – Jansante 37 pass from Clement (kick failed)
 Pittsburgh – Compagno 55 int (Glamp kick)
 Pittsburgh – Safety, Jacobs tackled in end zone by Calcagni
 Green Bay – Luhn 27 pass from Jacobs (Cuff kick)

 Week 8 
Sunday, November 9: Washington Redskins 

at Forbes Field, Pittsburgh, Pennsylvania

 Game time: 
 Game weather: 
 Game attendance: 36,257
 Referee:Scoring Drives: Pittsburgh – Lach run (Glamp kick)
 Pittsburgh – Compagno 2 run (Glamp kick)
 Washington – Taylor 24 pass from Baugh (Poillon kick)
 Pittsburgh – Clement 18 run (Glamp kick)
 Washington – Castiglia 2 run (Poillon kick)

 Week 9 
Sunday, November 16: New York Giants

at Forbes Field, Pittsburgh, Pennsylvania

 Game time: 
 Game weather: 
 Game attendance: 35,000
 Referee:Scoring Drives: Pittsburgh – FG Glamp 12
 New York – Paschka 2 run (Strong kick)
 Pittsburgh – Compagno 4 run (Glamp kick)
 Pittsburgh – Jansante 19 pass from Clement (Glamp kick)
 Pittsburgh – Seabright 39 int (Glamp kick)

 Week 10 
Sunday, November 23: Chicago Bears

at Wrigley Field, Chicago, IllinoisScoring Drives: Game time: 
 Game weather: 
 Game attendance: 34,142
 Referee:Scoring Drives: Chicago Bears – McAfee 2 run (McLean kick)
 Chicago Bears – Kavanaugh 6 pass from Luckman (McLean kick)
 Chicago Bears – McAfee 4 run (McLean kick)
 Pittsburgh – Jansante 15 pass from Morales (Glamp kick)
 Chicago Bears – Kindt 3 run (McLean kick)
 Chicago Bears – Keane 6 pass from Luckman (McLean kick)
 Chicago Bears – Gulyanics 44 run (McLean kick)

 Week 11 
Sunday, November 30: Philadelphia Eagles

at Shibe Park, Philadelphia, Pennsylvania

 Game time: 
 Game weather: 
 Game attendance: 37,218
 Referee:Scoring Drives: Philadelphia – Van Buren 2 run (Patton kick)
 Philadelphia – Muha 28 run (Patton kick)
 Philadelphia – Mackrides 1 run (Patton kick)

 Week 12 
Sunday, December 7: Boston Yanks

at Forbes Field, Pittsburgh, Pennsylvania

 Game time: 
 Game weather: 
 Game attendance: 31,398
 Referee:Scoring Drives: Pittsburgh – Mastrangelo recovered blocked punt in end zone (Glamp kick)
 Pittsburgh – FG Glamp 30
 Boston – Golding 14 run (Maznicki kick)
 Pittsburgh – Lach 1 run (Glamp kick)

Post season

 Game summary 

 Week 14 
Sunday, December 21: Philadelphia Eagles

at Forbes Field, Pittsburgh, Pennsylvania

 Game time: 2:00 pm EST
 Game weather: 
 Game attendance: 35,729
 Referee:Scoring Drives: Philadelphia – Van Buren 15 pass from Thompson (Patton kick)
 Philadelphia – Ferrante 28 pass from Thompson (Patton kick)
 Philadelphia – Pritchard 79 punt return (Patton kick)

All-Pro Honors

 Val Jansante  2nd Team, UPI
 Charlie Mehelich  2nd Team, Chicago Herald
 Red Moore 1st Team, UPI
 Johnny Clement 2nd Team AP, 2nd Team UPI
 Chuck Cherundolo ''' 2nd Team AP, 2nd Team UPI

Standings

References

Pittsburgh Steelers seasons
Pittsburgh Steelers
Pitts